Laws of Attraction is a 2004 romantic comedy film directed by Peter Howitt, based on a story by Aline Brosh McKenna and screenplay by Robert Harling and McKenna. It stars Pierce Brosnan and Julianne Moore.

Plot
High-powered divorce attorneys Audrey Woods and Daniel Rafferty have seen love go wrong in many scenarios—so, how good could their own chances be? As two of the top divorce lawyers in New York, Audrey and Daniel are a study in opposites. She practices law strictly by the book. He seems to win by the seat of his pants, or by "cheap theatrics," as Audrey says in one scene.

Soon the two lawyers are pitted against one another in several high-profile divorce cases, including a nasty public split between rock star Thorne Jamison and his dress-designer wife, Serena. The settlement hinges on an Irish castle, Caisleán Cloiche, or "Rock Castle," that each spouse wants. Audrey and Daniel travel to Ireland to chase down depositions, and both stay in the castle. Although Audrey, at least, is reluctant to acknowledge their mutual attraction, they find themselves attending a romantic Irish festival together. After a night of wild celebration, they wake up the next morning to discover they have wed. Audrey is shocked, though Daniel takes their apparent marriage in his stride.

The pair return to New York and find news of their wedding printed on Page 6 of the New York Post the following day. Audrey suggests the two maintain the semblance of a marriage for the sake of their careers, and Daniel moves into the guest room of Audrey's apartment. Although, in the courtroom they continue to fight the Jamisons' high-profile divorce case with the gusto they have always shown, at home, they settle into domestic life together. While disposing of garbage one day, Daniel accidentally discovers some sensitive information about Audrey's client, Thorne Jamison, which he reveals in the next day's court proceedings. Audrey feels betrayed and asks for a divorce, which Daniel agrees to give, citing his love for her.

Next, their famous clients each return to the castle in Ireland, even though they are not permitted to be there because of the pending division of assets. Judge Abramovitz sends their respective counselors to Ireland to inform them of this, but on arrival they discover the celebrity couple has reconciled on the seventh anniversary of their wedding, which took place at the castle. Audrey and Daniel then learn that the "priest" who performed their own marriage ceremony is in fact the Jamisons' butler, and the "weddings" he presided over at the festival were simply romantic celebrations.

Daniel returns immediately to New York, alone, but with Audrey fast on his heels, as she realizes she has fallen in love with him. Confronting him in the grocery store below Daniel's Chinatown office, Audrey asks Daniel if he is willing to fight to save their relationship. In the romantic final scenes, the couple are married in a private ceremony in Judge Abramovitz's chambers, with Audrey's mother as the sole witness.

Cast
 Pierce Brosnan as Daniel Rafferty
 Julianne Moore as Audrey Woods
 Parker Posey as Serena Jamison
 Michael Sheen as Thorne Jamison
 Frances Fisher as Sara Miller
 Nora Dunn as Judge Abramovitz
 Mike Doyle as Michael Rawson
 Allan Houston as Adamo Shandela
 Johnny Myers as Ashton Phelps
 Heather Ann Nurnberg as Leslie
 Brette Taylor as Mary Harrison
 Sara Gilbert as Gary Gadget's assistant

Reception
Laws of Attraction received generally negative reviews from critics, as it holds a 18% rating on Rotten Tomatoes where the site calls the film "a bland and forgettable copy of Adam's Rib." On Metacritic, the film holds a 38/100 rating, indicating "generally unfavorable" reviews.

The film opened at No. 5 in the US box office in the weekend of 30 April 2004, raking in US$6,728,905 in its first opening weekend.

References

External links
 
 
 
 
 
 
 

2004 films
2004 romantic comedy films
2000s screwball comedy films
Irish romantic comedy films
British courtroom films
British romantic comedy films
German romantic comedy films
English-language German films
English-language Irish films
Films scored by Edward Shearmur
Films directed by Peter Howitt
Films about music and musicians
Films set in Ireland
Films set in New York City
Films shot in Ireland
Films shot in New York City
Films with screenplays by Aline Brosh McKenna
Initial Entertainment Group films
New Line Cinema films
2000s English-language films
2000s British films
2000s German films